Larry King (born Lawrence Harvey Zeiger; November 19, 1933 – January 23, 2021) was an American television and radio host, whose awards included 2 Peabodys, an Emmy and 10 Cable ACE Awards. Over his career, he hosted over 50,000 interviews.

King was born and raised in New York City to Jewish parents who immigrated to the United States from Belarus in the 1930s. He studied at Lafayette High School, a public high school in Brooklyn. He was a WMBM radio interviewer in the Miami area in the 1950s and 1960s, and gained prominence in 1978 as host of The Larry King Show, an all-night nationwide call-in radio program heard on the Mutual Broadcasting System.

From 1985 to 2010, he hosted the nightly interview television program Larry King Live on CNN. King hosted Larry King Now from 2012 to 2020, which aired on Hulu, Ora TV, and RT America. He hosted Politicking with Larry King, a weekly political talk show, on the same three channels from 2013 to 2020. King also appeared in television series and films, usually playing himself. He remained active until his death in 2021, from complications of COVID-19 and sepsis, at the age of 87.

Early life and education 
King was born in Brooklyn on November 19, 1933. He was one of two children of Jennie ( Gitlitz), a garment worker who was born in Minsk, Russian Empire, and Aaron Zeiger, a restaurant owner and defense-plant worker who was born in Pinsk, Russian Empire. His parents were Orthodox Jews who immigrated to the United States from Belarus in the 1930s.

King attended Lafayette High School, a public high school in Brooklyn. When King was nine years old, his father died of a heart attack. This resulted in King, his mother, and brother going on government welfare. King was greatly affected by his father's death, and subsequently lost interest in his schoolwork.

After graduating from high school, King worked to help support his mother. From an early age, he desired to work in radio broadcasting.

Career

Miami radio and television 

A CBS staff announcer, whom King met by chance, suggested he go to Florida which was a growing media market with openings for inexperienced broadcasters. King went to Miami, and after initial setbacks, he gained his first job in radio. The manager of a small station, WAHR (now WMBM) in Miami Beach, hired him to clean up and perform miscellaneous tasks. When one of the station's announcers abruptly quit, King was put on the air. His first broadcast was on May 1, 1957, working as the disc jockey from 9 a.m. to noon. He also did two afternoon newscasts and a sportscast. He was paid $50 a week.

He acquired the name Larry King when the general manager declared that Zeiger was too difficult to remember, so minutes before airtime, Larry chose the surname "King", which he got from an advertisement in the Miami Herald for King's Wholesale Liquor. Within two years, he legally changed his name to Larry King.

He began to conduct interviews on a mid-morning show for WIOD, at Pumpernik's Restaurant in Miami Beach. He would interview whoever walked in. His first interview was with a waiter at the restaurant. Two days later, singer Bobby Darin, in Miami for a concert that evening, walked into Pumpernik's having heard King's radio show; Darin became King's first celebrity interview guest.

King's Miami radio show brought him local attention. A few years later, in May 1960, he hosted Miami Undercover, airing Sunday nights at 11:30 p.m. on WPST-TV Channel 10 (now WPLG).

King credited his success on local television to the assistance of comedian Jackie Gleason, whose national television variety show was being taped in Miami Beach beginning in 1964. "That show really took off because Gleason came to Miami," King said in a 1996 interview he gave when inducted into the Broadcasters' Hall of Fame. "He did that show and stayed all night with me. We stayed till five in the morning. He didn't like the set, so we broke into the general manager's office and changed the set. Gleason changed the set, he changed the lighting, and he became like a mentor of mine."

During this period, WIOD gave King further exposure as a color commentator for the Miami Dolphins of the National Football League, during their 1970 season and most of their 1971 season. However, he was dismissed by both WIOD and television station WTVJ as a late-night radio host and sports commentator as of December 20, 1971, when he was arrested after being accused of grand larceny by a former business partner, Louis Wolfson. Other staff covered the Dolphins' games into their 24–3 loss to Dallas in Super Bowl VI. King also lost his weekly column at the Miami Beach Sun newspaper. The charges were dropped. Eventually, King was rehired by WIOD. For several years during the 1970s, he hosted a sports talk-show called "Sports-a-la-King" that featured guests and callers.

The Larry King Show 

On January 30, 1978, King began broadcasting a nightly coast-to-coast program on the Mutual Broadcasting System, inheriting the talk show slot that had begun with Herb Jepko in 1975, then followed by "Long John" Nebel in 1977, until his illness and death the following year. King's Mutual show rapidly developed a devoted audience, called "King-aholics".

The Larry King Show was broadcast live Monday through Friday from midnight to 5:30 a.m. Eastern Time. King would interview a guest for the first hour, with callers asking questions that continued the interview for the next two hours. At 3 a.m., the Open Phone America segment began, where he allowed callers to discuss any topic they pleased with him, until the end of the program when he expressed his own political opinions. Many stations in the western time zones carried the Open Phone America portion of the show live, followed by the guest interview on tape delay.

Some of King's regular callers used pseudonyms or were given nicknames by King, such as "The Numbers Guy", "The Chair", "The Portland Laugher", "The Miami Derelict", and "The Scandal Scooper". At the beginning, the show had 28 affiliates, though the number was eventually above 500. King hosted the show until stepping down in 1994. King occasionally entertained the audience by telling amusing stories from his youth or early broadcasting career.

For its final year, the show was moved to afternoons. After King stepped down, Mutual gave the afternoon slot to David Brenner and Mutual's affiliates were given the option of carrying the audio of King's new CNN evening television program. After Westwood One dissolved Mutual in 1999, the radio simulcast of the CNN show continued until December 31, 2009.

Larry King Live 
Larry King Live began on CNN in June 1985. On the show, King hosted a broad range of guests, from figures such as UFO conspiracy theorists and alleged psychics, to prominent politicians and entertainment industry figures, often doing their first or only interview on breaking news stories on his show. After broadcasting his CNN show from 9 to 10 p.m., King then traveled to the studios of the Mutual Broadcasting System to do his radio show, when both shows still aired.

Two of his best-remembered interviews involved political figures. In 1992, billionaire Ross Perot announced his presidential bid on the show. In 1993, a debate between Al Gore and Perot became CNN's most-watched segment until 2015.

Unlike many interviewers, King had a direct, non-confrontational approach. His reputation for asking easy, open-ended questions made him attractive to important figures who wanted to state their position while avoiding being challenged on contentious topics. King said that when interviewing authors, he did not read their books in advance, so that he would not know more than his audience. Throughout his career, King interviewed many of the leading figures of his time. According to CNN, King conducted more than 30,000 interviews in his career.

King also wrote a regular newspaper column in USA Today for almost 20 years, from shortly after that first national newspaper's debut in Baltimore–Washington in 1982 until September 2001. The column consisted of short "plugs, superlatives and dropped names" but was dropped when the newspaper redesigned its "Life" section. The column was resurrected in blog form in November 2008 and on Twitter in April 2009.

During his career, he did more than 60,000 interviews. CNN's Larry King Live became "the longest-running television show hosted by the same person, on the same network and in the same time slot", and was recognized for it by the Guinness Book of World Records. He retired in 2010 after taping 6,000 episodes of the show.

Departure 
On June 29, 2010, King announced that after 25 years, he would be stepping down as the show's host. However, he stated that he would remain with CNN to host occasional specials. The announcement came in the wake of speculation that CNN had approached Piers Morgan, the British television personality and journalist, as King's primetime replacement, which was confirmed that September.

The final edition of Larry King Live aired on December 16, 2010. The show concluded with his last thoughts and a thank you to his audience for watching and supporting him over the years. The concluding words of Larry King on the show were, "I... I, I don't know what to say except to you, my audience, thank you. And instead of goodbye, how about so long."

On February 17, 2012, CNN announced that he would no longer host specials.

Shows on Ora TV 
In March 2012, King co-founded Ora TV, a production company, with his then-wife Shawn Southwick-King and Mexican business magnate Carlos Slim. On January 16, 2013, Ora TV celebrated their 100th episode of Larry King Now. In September 2017, King stated that he had no intention of ever retiring and expected to host his programs until he died.

Ora TV signed a multi-year deal with Hulu to exclusively carry King's new talk-oriented web series, Larry King Now, beginning July 17. On October 23, 2012, King hosted the third-party presidential debate on Ora TV, featuring Jill Stein, Rocky Anderson, Virgil Goode, and Gary Johnson.

In May 2013, the Russian-owned RT America network announced that they struck a deal with Ora TV to host the Larry King Now show on its network. King said in an advertisement on RT America: "I would rather ask questions to people in positions of power, instead of speaking on their behalf." The show continued to be available on Hulu.com and Ora.tv.

When criticized for doing business with a Russian-owned TV network in 2014, King responded, "I don't work for RT", commenting that his podcasts, Larry King Now and Politicking, are licensed for a fee to RT America by New York-based Ora TV. "It's a deal made between the companies ... They just license our shows. If they took something out, I would never do it. It would be bad if they tried to edit out things. I wouldn't put up with it."

Other ventures

King remained active as a writer and television personality thereafter.

King guest starred in episodes of Arthur, 30 Rock and Gravity Falls, had cameos in Ghostbusters and Bee Movie, and voiced Doris the Ugly Stepsister in Shrek 2 and its sequels. He also played himself in The People v. O. J. Simpson: American Crime Story and appeared as himself in an episode of Law and Order: Trial by Jury.

King hosted the educational television series In View with Larry King from 2013 to 2015, which was carried on cable television networks including Fox Business Network and Discovery and produced by The Profiles Series production company.

King and his wife Shawn appeared on WWE Raw in October 2012, participating in a storyline involving professional wrestlers The Miz and Kofi Kingston.

King became a very active user on the social-networking site Twitter, where he posted thoughts and commented on a wide variety of subjects. King stated, "I love tweeting, I think it's a different world we've entered. When people were calling in, they were calling into the show and now on Twitter, I'm giving out thoughts, opinions. The whole concept has changed."

After 2011, he also made various television infomercials, often appearing as a "host" discussing products like omega-3 fatty acid dietary supplement OmegaXL with guests, in an interview style reminiscent of his past television programs. 

ProPublica reported that in 2019 King had been manipulated into starring in a fake interview with a Russian journalist containing disinformation about Chinese dissident Guo Wengui, which was subsequently spread by Chinese government associated social media accounts.

Charitable works 
Following his 1987 heart attack, King founded the Larry King Cardiac Foundation, a non-profit organization which paid for life-saving cardiac procedures for people who otherwise would not be able to afford them.

On August 30, 2010, King served as the host of Chabad's 30th annual "To Life" telethon, in Los Angeles.

He donated to the Beverly Hills 9/11 Memorial Garden, where his name is on the monument.

Personal life 
King was married eight times, to seven women. He married high-school sweetheart Freda Miller in 1952 at age 19. That union ended the following year at the behest of their parents, who reportedly had the marriage annulled. He was later briefly married to Annette Kaye, who gave birth to his son, Larry Jr., in November 1961. King did not meet Larry Jr. until the latter was in his 30s.

In 1961, King married his third wife, Alene Akins, a Playboy Bunny, at one of the magazine's eponymous nightclubs. He adopted Akins' son Andy in 1962; the couple divorced the following year. In 1963, he married his fourth wife, Mary Francis "Mickey" Sutphin, who divorced him. He remarried Akins, with whom he had a second child, Chaia, in 1969. The couple divorced a second time in 1972. In 1997, Dove Books published a book written by King and Chaia, Daddy Day, Daughter Day. Aimed at young children, it tells each of their accounts of his divorce from Akins.

On September 25, 1976, King married his fifth wife, mathematics teacher and production assistant Sharon Lepore. The couple divorced in 1983.

King met businesswoman Julie Alexander in 1989, and proposed to her on the couple's first date on August 1, 1989. Alexander became King's sixth wife on October 7, 1989, when the two were married in Washington, D.C. The couple lived in different cities, however, with Alexander in Philadelphia, and King in Washington, D.C., where he worked. They separated in 1990 and divorced in 1992. He became engaged to actress Deanna Lund in 1995, after five weeks of dating, but they remained unmarried.

In 1997, he married his seventh wife, Shawn Southwick, born in 1959 (as Shawn Ora Engemann), a singer, actress, and TV host. They wed in King's Los Angeles hospital room three days before he underwent heart surgery to clear an occluded blood vessel. The couple had two children: Chance, born March 1999, and Cannon, born May 2000. He was stepfather to Arena Football League quarterback Danny Southwick. On King and Southwick's 10th anniversary in September 2007, Southwick joked she was "the only [wife] to have lasted into the two digits". Larry and Shawn King filed for divorce in 2010 but reconciled, and filed for divorce again on August 20, 2019. They were estranged and going through divorce proceedings at the time of King's death in 2021.

From his seven wives, King had five children and nine grandchildren, as well as four great-grandchildren. His children with Alene (Andy and Chaia), died within weeks of each other in August 2020, Andy at 65 from a heart attack and Chaia at 51 from lung cancer.

King resided in Beverly Hills, California. A lifelong Brooklyn / Los Angeles Dodgers fan, he was frequently seen behind home plate at the team's games. He was previously part of an investment group that attempted to bring a Major League Baseball franchise to Buffalo, New York, in 1990. He lost $2.8 million to Bernie Madoff.

In 2009, 2011, and several times in 2015, King said that he would like to be cryonically suspended. He discussed the issue with his family two years before his death, and "after much consideration," he decided that he did not want to undergo the procedure. 

In his early eighties, King took human growth hormone daily.

After describing himself as a Jewish agnostic in 2005, he stated that he was fully atheist in 2015. In 2017, he told The Jerusalem Post, "I love being Jewish, am proud of my Jewishness, and I love Israel".

Illnesses and death 
On February 24, 1987, King had a major heart attack before a successful quintuple-bypass surgery. Following this, he wrote two books about living with heart disease. Mr. King, You're Having a Heart Attack: How a Heart Attack and Bypass Surgery Changed My Life (1989), which was written with New York's Newsday science editor B. D. Colen, and Taking On Heart Disease: Famous Personalities Recall How They Triumphed over the Nation's #1 Killer and How You Can, Too (2004), which features the experience of various celebrities with cardiovascular disease, including Peggy Fleming and Regis Philbin. King quit smoking after the heart attack, having smoked three packs of cigarettes a day until then.

King related his heart attack experience in an interview in the 2014 British documentary film The Widowmaker, which advocates for coronary calcium scanning to motivate preventive cardiology and highlights the financial conflicts of interest in the widespread use of coronary stents. He received annual chest X-rays to monitor his heart condition. During his 2017 examination, doctors discovered a malignant tumor in his lung. It was then successfully removed with surgery.

On April 23, 2019, King underwent a scheduled angioplasty and also had stents inserted. It was erroneously reported that he had another heart attack along with heart failure; these claims were later retracted. He returned to Politicking with Larry King on August 15. On November 27, he said he had had a stroke in March, and was in a coma "for weeks". He later admitted he had contemplated suicide following the stroke, telling Los Angeles television station KTLA, "I thought I was just going to bite the bullet. I didn't want to live this way."

On January 2, 2021, it was revealed that King had been hospitalized with COVID-19 ten days earlier in a Los Angeles hospital. King's widow Shawn Southwick-King told Entertainment Tonight that he had recovered from COVID-19, but died of sepsis as a complication on January 23, 2021, at the age of 87 at Cedars-Sinai Medical Center, Los Angeles. According to the death certificate obtained by People magazine, sepsis was the immediate cause of death. It also listed two underlying conditions leading to the infection—acute hypoxemic respiratory failure and end-stage renal disease.

In February 2021, it was reported that Shawn had gone to court to contest the deceased's handwritten will written in 2019, which had left his estate (valued at $2 million) to his five surviving children. Shawn alleges her stepson Larry King Jr. exerted undue influence over his father towards the end of his life, and that the handwritten will conflicts with a will he signed in 2015, in which she was named executor of his estate. This does not include more valuable "assets that were held in trusts".

Filmography

Film

Television

Awards and nominations 

King received many broadcasting awards. He won the Peabody Award for Excellence in broadcasting for both his radio (1982) and television (1992) shows. He also won ten CableACE Awards for Best Interviewer and for Best Talk Show Series.

In 1989, King was inducted into the National Radio Hall of Fame, and in 1996 to the Broadcasters' Hall of Fame. In 2002, the industry publication Talkers Magazine named King both the fourth-greatest radio talk show host of all time and the top television talk show host of all time.

In 1994, King received the Scopus Award from the American Friends of Hebrew University. In 1996, he received the Golden Plate Award of the American Academy of Achievement presented by Awards Council member Art Buchwald.

He was given the Golden Mike Award for Lifetime Achievement in January 2008, by the Radio & Television News Association of Southern California.

King was an honorary member of the Rotary Club of Beverly Hills. He was also a recipient of the President's Award honoring his impact on media from the Los Angeles Press Club in 2006.

King was the first recipient of the Arizona State University Hugh Downs Award for Communication Excellence, presented April 11, 2007, via satellite by Downs himself.

King was awarded an honorary degree of Doctor of Humane Letters by Bradley University; for which he said "is really a hoot". King received numerous honorary degrees from George Washington University, the Columbia School of Medicine, Brooklyn College, the New England Institute of Technology, and the Pratt Institute.

References

External links 
 Larry King Live – Transcripts of all interviews since 2000
 
 
 
 Larry King's Final On-Camera Interview Silver Screen Studios - Dispatches from Quarantine (May 11, 2020)
 Larry King at Find a Grave

1933 births
2021 deaths
20th-century American Jews
20th-century American male actors
20th-century American male writers
21st-century American Jews
21st-century American male actors
21st-century American male writers
American atheists
American columnists
American male film actors
American male television actors
American newspaper writers
American people of Austrian-Jewish descent
American people of Belarusian-Jewish descent
American people of Lithuanian-Jewish descent
American people of Russian-Jewish descent
American talk radio hosts
American television talk show hosts
Baseball spectators
Burials at Hillside Memorial Park Cemetery
Cryonicists
CNN people
Deaths from kidney failure
Deaths from respiratory failure
Deaths from sepsis
Infectious disease deaths in California
Jewish American atheists
Jewish American journalists
Jewish American male actors
Jewish American writers
Lafayette High School (New York City) alumni
Male actors from Miami
Male actors from New York City
Miami Dolphins announcers
National Football League announcers
Peabody Award winners
People from Beverly Hills, California
People from Hollywood, Florida
People from Miami Beach, Florida
Radio personalities from Miami
Radio personalities from New York City
RT (TV network) people
Writers from Brooklyn
Writers from Miami